Mr. Corman is an American comedy-drama television series created by, written by, directed by, and starring Joseph Gordon-Levitt. The series premiered on August 6, 2021, on Apple TV+. In October 2021, the series was canceled after one season.

Premise 
Mr. Corman is described as a deep cut into the days and nights of a public school teacher in the San Fernando Valley.

Cast

Main 
Joseph Gordon-Levitt as Josh Corman, a public school teacher in the San Fernando Valley
 Arturo Castro as Victor, Josh's friend and roommate

Guest 
 Debra Winger as Ruth Corman, Josh's mother
Shannon Woodward as Elizabeth Corman, Josh's sister
Logic as Dax, Josh's friend and a social media influencer 
 Juno Temple as Megan, Josh's former girlfriend and Dax's childhood friend
Lucy Lawless as Cheryl, Meghan's mother
Hugo Weaving as Artie, Josh's estranged father
Amanda Crew as Ms. Perry-Geller, Josh's coworker and an art teacher
Emily Tremaine as Lindsey 
 Jamie Chung as Emily
 Veronica Falcon as Beatriz, a coworker at school

Episodes

Production

Development 
On September 5, 2019, Deadline Hollywood reported that Joseph Gordon-Levitt would be directing, writing, and executive producing Mr. Corman along with A24. In March 2020, Bruce Eric Kaplan joined as showrunner and executive producer, with Ravi Nandan, Nathan Reinhart, and Inman Young also executive producing under A24.
In October 2021, the series was canceled after one season.

Casting 
Joseph Gordon-Levitt is set to star in the series as Josh Corman. Variety reported on March 10, 2020 that Arturo Castro will portray the part of Victor. In an interview with music critic and YouTuber Anthony Fantano on September 4, 2020, the Maryland rapper Logic said that he auditioned and got a part in the series.

Filming 
In March 2020, after three weeks of filming in Los Angeles, production was shut down due to the COVID-19 pandemic. While being interviewed by The Talk in October 2020, Gordon-Levitt revealed that production was being moved from Los Angeles to New Zealand to feel safer while filming. In February 2021, Deadline Hollywood reported that the series was in the last few weeks of filming.

Release 
In February 2021, Apple announced that the series, along with a handful of others, would have a mid-2021 premiere. In May, Apple confirmed that the series would premiere on August 6, 2021.

Reception 
The review aggregator website Rotten Tomatoes reports a 70% approval rating with an average score of 5.80/10 based on 40 critic reviews. The website's critical consensus reads, "A slow build that won't work for everyone, Mr. Cormans dazzling visuals and catchy musical numbers are let down by rote characterizations and a main character who can be hard to root for." Metacritic, which uses a weighted average, assigned a score of 59 out of 100 based on 21 critics, indicating "mixed or average reviews".

References

External links 
 

Apple TV+ original programming
2020s American comedy-drama television series
2020s American school television series
2020s American workplace comedy television series
2020s American workplace drama television series
2021 American television series debuts
2021 American television series endings
English-language television shows
Television series about educators
Television series by A24
Television productions suspended due to the COVID-19 pandemic
Television shows filmed in New Zealand
Television shows set in Los Angeles County, California